Little Nellie may refer to:

 a fictional James Bond autogyro aircraft, seen in the film You Only Live Twice
 Little Nellie 007, a book about that aircraft
 Wallis WA-116 Agile, the actual aircraft type used in the film

See also
 Little Nell (disambiguation)
 Wet Nellie
 Nellie Wallace